In molecular biology, SNORA41 (also known as ACA41) is a member of the H/ACA class of small nucleolar RNA that guide the sites of modification of uridines to pseudouridines.

The family also includes the mouse sequence MBI-83.

References

External links 
 

Small nuclear RNA